Grupo Desportivo de Peniche is a Portuguese football club located in Peniche, Portugal. The club was founded on January 30, 1941 and currently plays in the Campeonato de Portugal (Serie C), holding home matches at Estádio do G.D. Peniche.

History 

After the merger of three small clubs, Dr. Ernesto Moreira, Francisco Salvador, José Miguel de Sousa, and a few other men from the Peniche municipality founded the club on January 30, 1941.

The club first started on the Portuguese Second Division and never reached the Primeira Liga as their best result was 2nd place on their respective zone, on the seasons of 1963–64, 1967–68 and 1971–72 but never made it through the playoffs.

They are filiated with AF Leiria, the districtal football association and C.F. Os Belenenses as number 14.

Current squad

Honours 

 AF Leiria Honour Division

Winners (3): 2007/08, 2014/15, 2017/18

 AF Leiria Cup

Winners (7): 1959/60, 1961/62, 1962/63, 1964/65, 1966/67, 2007/08, 2014/15

 AF Leiria Supercup

Winners (3): 2008/09, 2015/16, 2017/18

 AF Leiria Honour Cup

Winners (2): 1987/88, 1992/93

Fans 

The official supporters group of the club are the Red Seagulls 2520, as an allusion to the high amount of seagulls on the city, due to its proximity to Berlengas and of course the main colour of the club. The group was created in March 2018.

References 

Peniche, Portugal
Football clubs in Portugal
Association football clubs established in 1941
1941 establishments in Portugal